Untold Stories of the E.R. is an American docudrama television series which airs on TLC and Discovery Life.

In this program, real-life emergency department doctors discuss their most bizarre and puzzling cases. Typically these involve medical sabotage, violently or strangely acting patients, life-threatening injuries, or even situations in which the E.R. physician is too overwhelmed or unequipped to handle the caseload but cannot transfer responsibility for the patient(s) to someone else.

The show follows a docudrama format in which the real-life E.R. physician narrates through a series of "talking head" clips, while their interactions with the patient are reenacted. The doctors often play themselves, and whenever possible, the patients themselves take part in the reenactment as well. In addition, the patients are sometimes shown in brief interviews to explain what happened during their ordeal. Occasionally, patients' names are changed and actors play their roles. All cases are based on actual events, but may have the surrounding circumstances changed for the sake of dramatization and not necessarily accurate from a clinical or technical standpoint.

On November 11, 2015, the show was renewed through season 11. The show began its 15th season in February 2020.

Production

While the show's format originally focused on one story per episode, since 2010 each episode covers three separate cases. The Discovery Health airings moved to Discovery Fit & Health (now Discovery Life) when Oprah Winfrey Network replaced Discovery Health in January 2011; however, as of February 2011, select reruns are also appearing in OWN's daytime lineup. Current episodes are now aired on Discovery Life and TLC.

, the  program are made available for streaming online on Pluto TV, Tubi (The first four seasons only, dubbed in Spanish), Prime Video,  and Vudu.

Untold Stories of the ER: Extra Dose
Untold Stories of the ER: Extra Dose is a spin off that takes normal episodes of the series and does a Pop-Up Video-esque take on them by featuring pop up facts about diseases, medication, etc.

Episode list

References

External links
 

2004 American television series debuts
2000s American medical television series
2010s American medical television series
2000s American reality television series
2010s American reality television series
English-language television shows
TLC (TV network) original programming
Discovery Health Channel original programming
Television series by GRB Entertainment